Mikhail Yuryevich Sinyov (born 21 June 1972) is a Russian former professional footballer.

Club career
He made his professional debut in the Soviet Top League in 1991 for PFC CSKA Moscow.

Honours
 Soviet Top League winner: 1991.
 Russian Premier League bronze: 2003.
 Soviet Cup finalist: 1992.

European club competitions
 UEFA Cup Winners' Cup 1994–95 with PFC CSKA Moscow: 2 games.
 UEFA Cup 2004–05 qualification with FC Rubin Kazan: 2 games.
 UEFA Cup 2006–07 qualification with FC Rubin Kazan: 1 game.
 UEFA Intertoto Cup 2007 with FC Rubin Kazan: 4 games.

References

1972 births
Footballers from Moscow
Living people
Soviet footballers
Russian footballers
Russia under-21 international footballers
Association football defenders
PFC CSKA Moscow players
FC KAMAZ Naberezhnye Chelny players
FC Arsenal Tula players
FC Moscow players
FC Rubin Kazan players
FC Ural Yekaterinburg players
Soviet Top League players
Russian Premier League players